Ardin may refer to:

Ardin, France
Ardin, North Khorasan, Iran
Ardin, Zanjan, Iran
Ardin, Khorramdarreh, Zanjan Province, Iran
Ardin (harp), a musical instrument of Mauritania